Robin Matthews is the United Kingdom leader of the European party Libertas, which fought all 72 British seats in the June 2009 European Parliament election. He stood as a candidate for South West England.

Matthews, a former lieutenant colonel in the Light Dragoons regiment of the British Army, has served in Cyprus, Bosnia, Sierra Leone, Iraq and Afghanistan. He retired from the army in 2008 after 20 years of service. Latterly, he became a strategic communications advisor in Afghanistan where he also acted as spokesman for the British Forces.

Married with three children, he lives in Bath, Somerset in the south west of England.

References

Libertas.eu
Leaders of political parties in the United Kingdom
Light Dragoons officers
British Army personnel of the Iraq War
British Army personnel of the War in Afghanistan (2001–2021)
Living people
Year of birth missing (living people)